is a 2019 Japanese animated military mecha science fantasy film based on Code Geass co-created by director Gorō Taniguchi and writer Ichirō Ōkouchi. The film is directed by Taniguchi, written by Ōkouchi, and produced by Sunrise. The film was released in Japan on February 9, 2019.

The film takes place in an alternate universe that was first depicted in the three-part compilation film: Initiation, Transgression, and Glorification, which was released between 2017 and 2018. The film serves as a direct sequel to the events of the three-part film.

The film has been licensed by Funimation and it had a limited theatrical release in the United States and Canada on May 5, 2019.

Plot
A year has passed since the events of the "Zero Requiem", a scheme Emperor Lelouch vi Britannia formulated to end conflict with his death, and Nunnally vi Britannia rules Britannia while aided by her bodyguard Suzaku Kururugi, who has taken the identity of Zero. Nunnally and Suzaku are in the middle of a goodwill visit to a desert nation when they are ambushed by a Knightmare squad; Suzaku is easily defeated and they are abducted. The two find themselves in the custody of Shalio and Shamna, the sibling rulers of the Kingdom of Zilkhistan which has suffered from the world peace crippling their primary export: mercenary soldiers. Shamna explains their plan to use Nunnally to access the collective unconsciousness within C's World to restore Zilkhistan's political might.

Suspecting Zilkhistan's involvement, Kallen Stadtfeld, Sayoko Shinozaki, and Lloyd Asplund infiltrate the country and run into C.C. and a physically resurrected but soulless Lelouch. C.C. explains that, after the Zero Requiem, their school friend Shirley Fenette smuggled Lelouch's corpse to her and that she resurrected Lelouch from the dead by reconstructing his corpse, but his memories and personality are trapped in the collective unconsciousness. The group launches an assault on a Zilkhistan prison, where they rescue Suzaku and discover an Aramu Gate, a portal to C's World. C.C. uses the portal to fully resurrect Lelouch. Lelouch once again dons the mantle of Zero and meets up with Britannian forces led by his half-sister Cornelia li Britannia and his former lieutenant Kaname Ohgi.

Lelouch's forces track Nunnally down and find her in a Zilkhistan temple. Lelouch infiltrates the temple and kills Shamna, but she activates her Geass and travels back six hours in the past, allowing her to perfectly predict Lelouch's actions. Lelouch uses his tactical prowess to deduce the mechanics of Shamna's Geass and knocks her out. He frees Nunnally, but learns that her mind has been transported into C's World. C.C. guides him into the collective unconsciousness, and he successfully rescues Nunnally. Suzaku kills Shalio in combat, destroying Shamna permanently. In the aftermath, Lelouch once again bequeaths the title of Zero to Suzaku and departs on a journey with C.C., taking the alias L.L. as his idea of a marriage proposal.

In a post-credits scene set in an undetermined future, L.L. and C.C. are shown standing over a mass grave in a forest, with L.L. stating he would take away the Geass of those who wield it without resolve. This post-credit scene served as the setup for the movie's picture drama where Lelouch and C.C. confronted a pirate and C.C. took away his Geass.

Voice cast

Production
In November 2016, the sequel project was announced on Code Geasss 10th anniversary event with the three-part compilation film project. In August 2018, it was announced that the sequel is a film project. The key members from the television series and the three-part compilation films returned for the sequel film, with director Gorō Taniguchi directing the film, Ichirō Ōkouchi providing the screenplay, manga artist group CLAMP providing character designs with Takahiro Kimura adapting the designs for animation, and Kōtarō Nakagawa and Hitomi Kuroishi composing the music for the film. Taniguchi and Ōkouchi confirmed that the sequel film takes place after the events of the three-part compilation film.

Release

Japanese release
The film was released in Japan on February 9, 2019.

English release
Funimation licensed the film, and had a limited theatrical release in the United States and Canada on May 5, 2019.

Reception

Box office
It was number six in its second weekend, with a cumulative gross of  up until then. Collectively, the Code Geass film franchise has grossed  at the Japanese box office.

Critical response
Richard Eisenbeis of Anime News Network gave the film "B" rating, and states "At the very least, this film can be completely ignored with impunity thanks to its built in loophole; the whole thing takes place in the film canon, not the TV series timeline. Therefore, the Code Geass you know and love remains the same as it's been since it finished airing a decade ago, and these events can be seen as just a tantalizing 'what if' if they're not to your liking."

References

External links
  
  at Funimation 
 

2019 anime films
2019 films
Animated films about time travel
Code Geass
Cyborgs in anime and manga
Discrimination in fiction
Fiction about curses
Films about prophets
Films about security and surveillance
Films about terrorism
Films set in the 2110s
Films with screenplays by Ichirō Ōkouchi
Funimation
Fiction about government
Japan in fiction
Japanese alternate history films
Military anime and manga
Monarchy in fiction
Sunrise (company)
Terrorism in fiction

ja:コードギアス 反逆のルルーシュ#復活のルルーシュ